GFH Capital, formerly known as Injazat Capital, is a firm of private equity investors, advisors and fund managers, providing capital and strategic support for growth companies. GFH Capital is among the region’s private equity firms, and is licensed by the Dubai Financial Services Authority. Established by the Islamic Corporation for the Development of the Private Sector (ICD), an affiliate of the Islamic Development Bank Group (IDB) and GFH Financial Group, GFH Capital introduced structured private equity investing and Islamic finance to the Gulf Cooperation Council (GCC). GFH Capital has structured investments exceeding USD 8bn in over 40 companies across 25 countries.

GFH Capital established and manages the Middle East’s first Sharia-compliant VC TMT fund: Injazat Technology Fund BSC (ITF I). ITF I has to date completed the full life cycle of the investment process with Internal rate of returns (IRR) of up to 75% including sales to blue chip companies. The International Chamber of Commerce (ICC) commended GFH Capital in regard to the principles of corporate governance. GFH Capital invests in growth companies at all stages of development; from founding start-ups and fostering growth in developing companies to leading recapitalizations or buy-outs of more mature businesses.

GFH Capital Board of Directors & Sharia Board
Dr. Ahmed Al-Mutawa, Chairman
Mosabah Al-Mutairy, Director
Hisham Alrayes Director
Mohammed Ameen Director
Yousif Al Ghanim Director

GFH Capital CEO
Jinesh Patel CEO

GFH Capital Financial information (Paid up Capital)
Amount of Authorised Share Capital: USD 100000000.00
Auditor: KPMG
Number of Issued shares: 2,467,000
Nominal Value of One Share: USD 9.917714
Amount of Paid Up Share Capital: USD 24467000.44

GFH Capital Projects

Injazat Technology Fund I (ITF I)
Injazat Technology Fund I is a USD 50million venture capital fund operating in compliance with Sharia’h principles and targeting technology, media and communications companies within the MENA region. ITF I was established by Islamic Corporation for the Development of the Private Sector (ICD), an affiliate of the Islamic Development Bank Group (IDB), and GFH Financial Group. It is in partnership with Dubai Islamic Bank (DIB) and Saudi Economic and Development Company (SEDCO).

US Residential Portfolio
Diversified US Residential Portfolio (DURP) was established in 2014 to acquire a diversified portfolio of multi-family residential complexes (Las Villas and Alta Vista in Houston and Ansley at Princeton Lakes in Atlanta) totaling 1,288 units; The properties were selected due to their proximity to large and growing infrastructure assets in the respective cities.

NurolLife Residential Project
The project is currently under construction in the Seyrantepe area of Istanbul on the European side. NurolLife is being built on a 9.500m2 plot and will be a project consisting of 502 residences, 50 offices and 2 floors of retail units. The project is designed by the architect Hakan Kıran. The project is due for completion in April 2017.

Queens Gate Residential Portfolio
The Queens Gate Residential Portfolio was established with the purpose of acquiring a Grade II listed freehold property in Central London. The property is currently arranged as five self-contained residential apartments located on the southern side of Queens Gate Gardens in the Royal Borough of Kensington & Chelsea.

References

External links
Official Website

Financial services companies of the United Arab Emirates
Private equity firms
Advisors
Companies listed on the Dubai Financial Market